Branchiostegus albus, is a species of marine ray-finned fish, a tilefish belonging to the family Malacanthidae. It is native to the Northwest Pacific, from southern Japan to the East China Sea.

References

Malacanthidae
Taxa named by James Keith Dooley
Fish described in 1978